Cleptometopus sericeus is a species of beetle in the family Cerambycidae. It was described by Gahan in 1895.

References

sericeus
Beetles described in 1895